Carl Ottosen (18 July 1918 – 8 January 1972) was a Danish actor, screenwriter and film director. He appeared in 70 films between 1947 and 1972.

Filmography

De pokkers unger - 1947
Bag de røde porte - 1951
Vejrhanen - 1952
 The Crime of Tove Andersen (1953)
I kongens klær - 1954
Karen, Maren og Mette - 1954
Kongeligt besøg - 1954
En sømand går i land - 1954
Vores lille by - 1954
Jeg elsker dig - 1957
Sønnen fra Amerika - 1957
Soldaterkammerater - 1958
Helle for Helene - 1959
Soldaterkammerater rykker ud - 1959
Vi er allesammen tossede - 1959
Forelsket i København - 1960
Frihedens pris - 1960
Soldaterkammerater på vagt - 1960
Tro, håb og trolddom - 1960
Poeten og Lillemor i forårshumør - 1961
Reptilicus - 1961
Soldaterkammerater på efterårsmanøvre - 1961
Sorte Shara - 1961
Soldaterkammerater på sjov - 1962
Journey to the Seventh Planet - 1962
Et døgn uden løgn - 1963
Peters landlov - 1963
Don Olsen kommer til byen - 1964
Fem mand og Rosa - 1964
Mord for åbent tæppe - 1964
Premiere i helvede - 1964
Tine - 1964
Flådens friske fyre - 1965
Passer passer piger - 1965
Dyden går amok - 1966
Nu stiger den - 1966
Pigen og greven - 1966
Slap af, Frede - 1966
Soyas tagsten - 1966
Sult - 1966
Jeg - en marki - 1967
Det er ikke appelsiner - det er heste - 1967
Smukke Arne og Rosa - 1967
Elsk din næste - 1967
Soldaterkammerater på bjørnetjeneste - 1968
Jeg - en kvinde 2 - 1968
Dyrlægens plejebørn - 1968
Der kom en soldat - 1969
Sjov i gaden - 1969
Amour - 1970
Præriens skrappe drenge - 1970
Nøglen til Paradis - 1970
Guld til præriens skrappe drenge - 1971
Tandlæge på sengekanten - 1971

References

External links

1918 births
1972 deaths
Danish male film actors
Danish male screenwriters
Danish film directors
People from Fredensborg Municipality
20th-century Danish male actors
People from Frederikshavn Municipality
20th-century screenwriters